Homer Lea (November 17, 1876 – November 1, 1912) was an American adventurer, author and geopolitical strategist.  He is today best known for his involvement with Chinese reform and revolutionary movements in the early twentieth century and as a close advisor to Dr. Sun Yat-sen during the 1911 Chinese Republican revolution that overthrew the Qing Dynasty, and for his writings about China, Germany, England, Japan, the Pacific and geopolitics. Homer Lea had no children, and neither did his two sisters.  His closest relative and first cousin was Malcolm Lea and Malcolm's son, Ralph Lea.  Malcolm Lea visited with Homer Lea in Los Angeles where Homer proudly gave him signed copies of his works.  Malcolm and Ralph Lea returned to Los Angeles to visit with Homer's sisters, Ermal and Hersa through the 1930s and for Lea family reunions.

Early life
Homer Lea was born in Denver, Colorado, to Alfred E. (1845–1909) and Hersa A. (1846–1879; née Coberly) Lea. He had two younger sisters, Ermal and Hersa. Alfred, a Tennessee native, had a successful real estate, abstract and brokerage business in Boulder, Colorado. Homer's mother Hersa was the widow of murdered abolitionist and soldier Captain Silas Soule (1838-1865). 

After Alfred's wife Hersa died from an unexpected illness in 1879, he married Emma R. Wilson in 1890 and moved his family to Los Angeles, California in 1893-94 after visiting the Lea family in New Mexico.

Lea came from an early pioneering family. His grandfather, Dr. Pleasant John Graves Lea (1807-1862), helped establish the town of Cleveland, Tennessee, in 1837, before moving his family to Jackson County, Missouri, in the late 1840s in search of new opportunities. He is the namesake for Lee's Summit, Missouri. The town was named after him in 1868 when the Missouri Pacific Railroad established a station near his property, which was the highest point of its St. Louis-Omaha line, but misspelled his name.  In 1884, Alfred Lea was involved in the establishment of Steamboat Springs, Colorado, and the following year helped his brother Joseph establish the town of Roswell, New Mexico, by surveying and drawing the first plat of the Roswell town site. In 1917, Joseph C. Lea (1841-1905), Alfred's brother, became the namesake for Lea County, New Mexico.

Lea was born seemingly healthy, but after suffering a drop as a baby, he became a hunchback, eventually standing five feet in height and weighing approximately 100 pounds. Lea's ancestors included crooked-backed military leaders like Conan the Crooked, Duke of Brittany, and a Duke of Lancaster known to have a crooked spine.  At about age 12 he went to the National Surgical Institute in Indianapolis, Indiana, where he received medical treatment that helped improve his stature. His health began deteriorating further from a degenerative kidney ailment known as Bright's disease and he suffered chronic headaches and vision problems that may have stemmed from constant pain and a diabetic condition.

Lea attended Boulder Central School (1886–1887), East Denver High School (1892–1893), the University of the Pacific college preparatory academy in San Jose, California (1893–1894), and Los Angeles High School (1894–1896). He was accepted at West Point, hoping for a military career, but was rejected when the school learned of his stature. He planned on going to Harvard University and becoming a lawyer, but financial setbacks altered his plans and he attended Occidental College in downtown Los Angeles (1897–1898), a few blocks from his home, for his freshman college year and Stanford University (1898–1899) for his sophomore and junior years, before dropping out of school for health reasons.

Lea was an avid reader, a charismatic debater, an avid fencer and an accomplished outdoorsman who refused to be bound by the limitations of his disabilities. While at Stanford, he became a proficient fencer, and also had a reputation for his prowess at chess and poker. He loved reading military history and particularly admired Napoleon, in part because he considered that the Emperor's slight stature (now, incidentally, known to be a myth) was an example of greatness unaffected by physical size. He excelled as a debater and developed effective skills in influencing others. He became president of the Los Angeles High School debating society and later president of the local Lyceum League national debating society chapter. He loved adventure and the outdoors and often went on rugged camping trips where he always carried his own weight. When the Spanish-American War broke out in April 1898, he joined a home-defense cavalry troop sponsored by some local Palo Alto businessmen which drilled for about six weeks before the semester ended and the university adjourned for summer recess.

Chinese affairs
Lea learned Chinese from the family cook in Colorado, and he developed a larger interest in China after his family moved to Los Angeles. Lea had dreams in which he saw himself as a famous martial monk.  He believed himself to be reincarnated as a famous military or martial monk which he shared with his new Chinese allies.  Knowing that China had a long history of secret societies, he joined Chinese secret societies located in the Chinatowns of Los Angeles and later in San Francisco. With such access and membership he further refined his Chinese language and cultural skills.  He believed in China and his own future in China, that he would have an opportunity to attain military glory.  He often visited Chinatown, taking his young friends along, and he befriended the Reverend Ng Poon Chew, a local Chinese Presbyterian missionary friend of his parents.  He met other Chinese through Ng Poon Chew and furthered his learning of Cantonese.  In 1899, while recuperating from a bout of smallpox, he learned of a recently organized Chinese society called the Bao Huang Hui (Protect the Emperor Society; also known as the Chinese Empire Reform Association), which Kang Youwei, a former adviser to the Chinese emperor, helped establish to restore the Guangxu Emperor to his throne.  The emperor had been deposed in 1898 by Empress Dowager Cixi for instituting Western reforms.

Lea saw an opportunity for adventure in China with the Bao Huang Hui rather than returning to Stanford. He convinced local Bao Huang Hui leaders that he was a military expert who could greatly benefit their cause, in part, by falsely claiming Confederate army general Robert E. Lee to be a relative. Chinese officials were also impressed by his extensive Stanford education. The Bao Huang Hui welcomed him into their ranks with promises of becoming a general in their upcoming military campaign to restore the emperor to power. He traveled to China in 1900, while the Boxer Uprising was underway, with high hopes of playing a major role in the military campaign. He became a lieutenant general in the Bao Huang Hui makeshift military forces, but had a relatively unimportant assignment that involved training rural volunteers away from any active military operations. After the Bao Huang Hui main military forces were defeated by the imperial army, his military adventures in China came to a virtual end. Lea would later tell varying and high embellished versions of these events, claiming that his forces were at Beijing in close pursuit of the fleeing Empress then surprised by an attack from the rear, and that he had to escape China disguised as a French missionary with a price on his head.

Lea returned to Santa Monica, California in 1901 and continued working with the Bao Huang Hui. He became the architect of a plan to train a Bao Huang Hui military cadre in America whose goal was to return to China and help restore the emperor to power. In 1904, he obtained funding and established a network of military schools nationwide to covertly train his soldiers. His soldiers wore uniforms similar to those of the U.S. Army, with the exception of having a dragon replacing the national eagle on buttons and hats, and he recruited U.S. Army veterans as drill instructors. Over 2000 mostly American-born Chinese were trained by Lea and his partner, Captain Ansel O'Banion. While his training scheme received popular attention in the press, it also resulted in a series of unwanted federal, state and local investigations, which subsequently led Kang Youwei to disavow Lea and his training scheme.

After breaking with the Bao Huang Hui, Lea again turned his ambitions to China. In 1908, he unsuccessfully sought to become a U.S. trade representative to China for the Roosevelt administration; and in 1909, he unsuccessfully sought to become the U.S. Minister to China for the Taft administration. In 1908, he also contrived a bold and audacious military venture in China called the "Red Dragon Plan" that called for organizing a revolutionary conspiracy to conquer the two southern Guangdong provinces. He conspired with a handful of American businessmen and Yung Wing, a prominent former Chinese diplomat and scholar living in America. Through Yung Wing, he planned to solicit a united front of various southern Chinese factions and secret societies to organize an army that he would command for the revolution.  If successful, Yung Wing was slated to head a coalition government of revolutionary forces while Lea and his fellow conspirators hoped to receive wide-ranging economic concessions from the new government.

When Sun Yat-sen came to America in late 1909 on a fund-raising trip, he met with Yung Wing, who convinced him that Lea and the Red Dragon conspirators could benefit his revolutionary movement.  The Red Dragon conspirators joined Sun Yat-sen's movement to topple the Manchu Dynasty and Lea became one of Sun Yat-sen's most trusted advisors.  Ultimately, the Red Dragon conspirators could not obtain the necessary financial backing for their plans and dissolved the conspiracy after a failed revolutionary attempt by Sun Yat-sen's followers in March 1911.  Lea, however, remained loyal to Sun Yat-sen.

In October 1911, Sun Yat-sen's forces succeeded in their revolution to depose the Manchu Dynasty.  Sun Yat-sen was in America on a fundraising trip when he received word that he was to be the president of the new Chinese provisional government.  He immediately contacted Lea to help arrange American and British governmental support for the revolutionary cause.  Sun Yat-sen and Lea believed in forming an Anglo-Saxon alliance with China that would grant the United States and Great Britain special status for their support.  Lea, who was in Wiesbaden, Germany, receiving medical treatment for his failing eyesight, met Sun Yat-sen in London, but they failed to obtain the desired Anglo-American support.

As Sun Yat-sen and Lea sailed together for China, Lea's influence on Sun Yat-sen appeared to be growing.  As their ship made several port calls along the way, Sun Yat-sen announced plans to make Lea the chief of staff of China's Republican army with authority to negotiate an end to hostilities with the imperial government.  Shortly after arriving in Shanghai, China, in late December 1911, however, Lea suffered a major reversal of fortunes.  He received word from the U.S. State Department that he could not be the chief of staff of China's Republican army since U.S. legal restrictions prevented him from aiding revolutionary movements.  At the same time, Chinese revolutionary leaders wary of his influence over Sun Yat-sen, considered him an interloper and wanted nothing to do with him, which further marginalized his position.  He remained Sun Yat-sen's close unofficial adviser until early February 1912, when he suffered a near fatal stroke that left him partially paralyzed and signaled an end to his stay in China.

Writings
Homer Lea's principal writings included three books, The Vermilion Pencil (1908), The Valor of Ignorance (1909), and The Day of the Saxon (1912).  His first book, The Vermilion Pencil, a romance novel, received critical acclaim.  The novel painted a colorful picture of Chinese rural life with a fast moving plot that centered on the relationship and romance of a French missionary and the young wife of a Chinese Viceroy.  Lea originally entitled it, The Ling Chee, (or lingchi in the present romanization) in reference to a type of Chinese execution by dismemberment. His publisher, McClure's, insisted on the change.  Lea collaborated with Oliver Morosco, the proprietor of the Burbank Theater in Los Angeles, to produce a dramatized version of The Ling Chee in the fall of 1907, but nothing came of the venture.  Lea subsequently wrote a dramatized version of his novel that he renamed The Crimson Spider.  In 1922, Japanese-born Sessue Hayakawa, a leading Hollywood film star and movie producer, adapted The Vermilion Pencil to the screen.

Lea's second book, The Valor of Ignorance, examined American defense and in part prophesied a war between America and Japan.  It created controversy and instantly elevated his reputation as a credible geo-political spokesman.  Two retired U.S. Army generals, including former Army Chief-of-Staff Adna Chaffee, wrote glowing introductions to the book, which also contained a striking frontispiece photograph of Lea in his lieutenant general's uniform.  The book contained maps of a hypothetical Japanese invasion of California and the Philippines and was very popular among American military officers, particularly those stationed in the Philippines over the next generation.  General Douglas MacArthur and his staff, for example, paid close attention to the book in planning the defense of the Philippines. The Japanese military also paid close attention to the book, which was translated into Japanese. Lea accurately predicted that the Japanese would capture Manila after landing at Lingayen Gulf, and that the city would fall in three weeks.  The book sold over 84,000 copies in its first three months after publication, and Lea donated the royalties to Sun Yat-sen. Carey McWilliams attributed to this book's depiction of a local fifth column the instigation of the modern anti-Japanese sentiment in the United States that would eventually lead to the internment of Japanese Americans.

Lea's final book, The Day of the Saxon, repeated the prophecy of war between America and Japan, and was written partly at the request of British Field Marshal Lord Roberts, who asked that Lea make a similar evaluation for the British Empire.  Japan, The Day of the Saxon asserted, must gain control of the Pacific before extending her sovereignty on the Asian continent. Japan's maritime frontiers must extend eastward of the Hawaiian Islands and southward of the Philippines. "Because of this Japan draws near to her next war—a war with America—by which she expects to lay the true foundation of her greatness." (1912: 92). Lea criticized the United States for its "indifference," party politics, and the lack of militarism which increase the chance of victory for Japan (1912: 92–93). The Day of the Saxon examined British imperial defense and predicted the break-up of the British Empire.  It too generated controversy and received most of its critical attention in Europe.  In The Day of the Saxon Lea believed the entire Anglo-Saxon race faced a threat from German (Teuton), Russian (Slav), and Japanese expansionism: The "fatal" relationship of Russia, Japan, and Germany "has now assumed through the urgency of natural forces a coalition directed against the survival of Saxon supremacy." It is "a dreadful Dreibund." (1912: 122)  Lea believed that while Japan moved against Far East and Russia against India, the Germans would strike at England, the center of the British Empire.  He thought the Anglo-Saxons faced certain disaster from their militant opponents. Two Pacts—Non-Aggression between Germany and Russia in 1939 and Neutrality between Russia and Japan in April 1941—much approached Lea's prophecy, but the German decision to attack Russia in June 1941 prevented the prophecy from coming true. Lea considered the possibility of war between Germany and Russia but did not believe that this war will take place before the defeat of the British Empire because the German-Russian war would be mutually disastrous for both (1912: 124–125).

In The Valor of Ignorance and The Day of the Saxon, Lea viewed American and British struggles for global competition and survival as part of a larger Anglo-Saxon social Darwinist contest between the "survival of the fittest" races.  He sought to make all English-speaking peoples see that they were in a global competition for supremacy against the Teutonic, Slavic, and Asian races.  He believed that once awakened, they would embrace his militant doctrines and prepare for the coming global onslaught.  China figured prominently in his world-view as a key ally with the Anglo-Saxons in counterbalancing other regional and global competitors.  He had plans for a third volume to complete a trilogy with The Valor of Ignorance and The Day of the Saxon, in which he sought to advance his social Darwinist beliefs by discussing the spread of democracy among nations, but he died before beginning the volume.

Later life and death

Lea returned to California in May 1912 to recover his health.  He had hopes of rejoining Sun Yat-sen, but he suffered another stroke in late October 1912, which proved fatal. He died on November 1, 1912, at his home in Ocean Park, Santa Monica. His final wishes were to be buried in China, but his cremated ashes remained with his family until they arranged for the Republic of China to receive them. In 1969, his ashes and those of his wife Ethel (née Bryant) were interred at Yangmingshan No. 1 Public Cemetery in Taipei, and travelled there in the custody of Ethel's son. President Chiang Kai-shek, Sun Yat-sen's brother-in-law, took a personal interest in the arrangements. He believed the interment of the Lea's ashes in Taiwan should only be temporary until they could be transferred to Nanking and interred by Sun Yat-sen's mausoleum, when Taiwan and mainland China were finally reunited.

To date, despite the availability of scholarly work on his life and career, a healthy mix of fact and possible exaggeration still surrounds Lea. For example, journalist Clare Boothe Luce's lengthy introduction to the 1942 edition of The Valor of Ignorance highlighted the book's influence on General Douglas MacArthur, the U. S. military commander in the Philippines, and his staff, and helped elevate Lea to the status of forgotten military genius and prophet. Booth's introduction and her lengthy 2 part lead article in Life Magazine, however, also fostered and perpetuated the aura of mystery and myth surrounding Lea. Not unlike medieval monks who copied books verbatim, including their mistakes, Boothe drew on numerous accounts, many accurate and some not, from writers and acquaintances of Lea without discriminating between myth and reality. Boothe made the same mistake as many before her and many continue to do. The problem began during Lea's lifetime when he was widely known as an international “man of mystery,” in part due to many exaggerated published accounts, rumors, and speculations about his exploits. He did little to set the record straight because the accounts helped advance his career without drawing undue attention to his illegal and covert activities. Furthermore, his papers were intentionally destroyed after his death to protect his former associates from actual and possible legal prosecution. General Chaffee who met with Lea in China during the Boxer Rebellion introduced Lea to Captain Ansel O'Banion, and by 1904, the two were training Chinese soldiers who were smuggled back into China, to join the military in China.  These Chinese sleeper soldiers would make the Revolution of October 10, 1911 ("10-10") quite short and nearly bloodless. In fact, Captain O'Banion was indicted and imprisoned by America for training Chinese to fight.

In popular culture
Homer Lea is portrayed by Michael Lacidonia in the film 1911, released in 2011.

Bibliography

Major works by
 1908  Internet Archive 

Reprinted 2003. - Stirling: Read Around Asia. - 

Reprinted 2017. - Special Revised Edition Edited by Lawrence M. Kaplan: Amazon/Createspace.com - 

 1909: The Crimson Spider. - Unpublished
Reprinted 2017. - Edited by Lawrence M. Kaplan: Amazon/Createspace.com - 

 1909: The Valor of Ignorance. - New York & London: Harper and Brothers. - 
Reprinted 1942. - 
 1912: The Day of the Saxon. -New York & London: Harper and Brothers. - 
Reprinted 1942.

Major works about
Anschel, Eugene, (1984). - Homer Lea, Sun Yat-Sen, and the Chinese Revolution. - Praeger Pubs. 
Alexander, Tom, (July, 1993). - "The Amazing Prophecies of "General" Homer Lea". - Smithsonian. - p. 102.
Kaplan, Lawrence (Sept. 15, 2010). - Homer Lea: American Soldier of Fortune (American Warriors Series). - The University Press of Kentucky. - 
O'Reilly, Tex and Thomas, Lowell,. - "Born to Raise Hell".  - p. 141-148. -

Notes

External links
The Homer Lea Research Center – developed by Lea's biographer Dr. Lawrence M. Kaplan
Homer Lea's remains arriving at Taipei, Songshan Airport (video)
 

1876 births
1912 deaths
Republic of China Army generals
Geopoliticians
American people of the Boxer Rebellion
American military writers
American mercenaries
People from Denver
Stanford University alumni
People of the 1911 Revolution